Star Awards 2012 (Chinese: 红星大奖 2012) was a double television award ceremony held in Singapore. It is part of the annual Star Awards organised by MediaCorp for the two free-to-air channels, MediaCorp Channel 8 and MediaCorp Channel U. Star Awards 2012 was live broadcast on Channel 8, on 22 and 29 April 2012, and the Post-Show party on Channel U after the broadcast of the second award ceremony.

Similar to the preceding ceremonies since 2010, the ceremony was split into two separate shows. The first show, titled 光辉大赏 (lit. Glorious Showcase), which focused on Professional and technical awards (which was given out to backstage crew and scriptwriters) as well as showcasing various drama skits to commemorate the 30th Anniversary of Chinese Drama Serials. The second show, titled 颁奖礼 (lit. Award Showcase), was held at the Grand Ballroom in Marina Bay Sands, which focused on main category awards honoring the television series of 2011-12. The first show were hosted by entertainment artistes Dasmond Koh, Michelle Chia, Lee Teng and Vivian Lai, while the second show were hosted by Guo Liang and Taiwanese singer-actress Bowie Tsang.

A Tale of 2 Cities, Love Thy Neighbour and the 2011's remake of the 1987's drama On the Fringe, the latter tying with Devotion for having the most nominations with 12, were tied with the most wins for the ceremony with three for all three series; A Tale of 2 Cities won Favourite Female Character Award on Show 1, and Best Actress and Best Newcomer on Show 2; Love Thy Neighbour won Young Talent and Top Rated Drama Programme awards in Show 1 and Best Supporting Actress in Show 2; the remake won Best Screenplay and Best Drama Editing on Show 1, and Best Drama Serial on Show 2, marking the first television remake to win the award. 20 programs winning at least one award (10 dramas, 10 variety/info-ed) was the largest representation for the number of winning programs in Star Awards history.

Programme details

Winners and nominees
Unless otherwise stated, the winners are listed first, highlighted in boldface.

Show 1 (红星大奖2012 光辉大赏)

Main awards
{| class=wikitable
|-
| valign="top" width="50%"|
 
Tan Jun Sheng 陈俊生  – Love Thy Neighbour 四个门牌一个梦 as 戴鼎新 
Dong Lu Ying 董璐颖  – Devotion 阿娣 as 姗姗 
Justin Peng 彭修轩  – On the Fringe 边缘父子
Oh Ling En 胡菱恩) – Devotion  阿娣 as 许思雯
Yong Joe Yan 杨祖恩  – Devotion  阿娣 as 小阿娣
| valign="top" width="50%"|
 
Kit Chan 陈洁仪  – Devotion  阿娣  –《倔强》 
Mavis Hee 许美静  – A Song to Remember 星洲之夜  – 《星洲之夜》
Wei En 微恩  – Kampong Ties 甘榜情  – 《甘榜情缘》
Anthony Neely 倪安东  – Secrets For Sale 拍。卖  – 《缠斗》
Anthony Neely 倪安东  – The Oath 行医  – 《救命》
|-
| valign="top" width="50%"|
 
Chong Liung Man 张龙敏  – C.L.I.F. 警徽天职 (Episode 20)
Kok Tzyy Haw 郭贽豪  – Kampong Ties 甘榜情 (Episode 9)
Leong Lye Lin 梁来玲  –  A Song to Remember 星洲之夜 (Episode 13)
Loo Yin Kam 卢燕金  – A Tale of 2 Cities 乐在双城 (Episode 14)
Loo Yin Kam 卢燕金  – Devotion 阿娣 (Episode 1)
| valign="top" width="50%"|
 
Ang Eng Tee 洪荣狄  – On the Fringe 边缘父子 (Episode16)
Chen Sew Khoon 陈秀群 and Lau Chin Poon 刘清盆  – The In-laws 麻婆斗妇 (Episode 11)
Paul Yuen 袁树伟 and Tang Yeow 陈耀  – A Tale of 2 Cities 乐在双城 (Episode 1)
Koh Teng Liang 许声亮  – Kampong Ties 甘榜情 (Episode 10)
Lim Gim Lan 林锦兰, Lau Chin Poon 刘清盆 and  Winnie Wong 王尤红  – Love Thy Neighbour 四个门牌一个梦 (Episode 9)
|-
| valign="top" width="50%"|
 
Elaine See  施意玲  – Mission Possible 小村大任务
Alfred Yeo 杨居辐  – It's a Small World 2 国记交意所2
Gan Bee Khim 颜美琴  – Renaissance 旧欢. 心爱
Khow Hwai Teng 邱慧婷  – Tongue Twister 巧言妙语
Tay Lay Tin 郑丽贞  – Rail Thrill 铁路次文化
| valign="top" width="50%"|
 
Sheffie Liang 梁雪慧  – Rail Thrill 铁路次文化
Hon Sher Ee 潘雪忆  – Food Source 2 食在好源头2
Lin Shih Han 林诗涵  – HDB Tai Tai 3 HDB 太太3
Ng Jin Puay 黄仁佩  – Tongue Twister 巧言妙语
Ng Sei Fong 吴雪枫  – Chef Apprentice 名厨实习生
|-
| valign="top" width="50%"|
 
Renaissance 旧欢. 心爱  – Single SpotAdventures of Chris 阿顺历险记  – Campaign, 3 Spots 
Follow Me 跟随我  – Single Spot 
Secrets For Sale 拍。卖  – Campaign, 3 Spots 
Unriddle 2 最火搭档2  – Campaign, 3 Spots
| valign="top" width="50%"|
 Tommy Lee 李兴顺  – A Song to Remember 星洲之夜Lim Hap Choon 林合存  – On the Fringe 边缘父子
Liu Wing Chung 廖永松  – C.L.I.F. 警徽天职
Soh Kok Leong 苏国良  – A Tale of 2 Cities 乐在双城
Tommy Lee 李兴顺  – Devotion 阿娣
|-
| valign="top" width="50%"|
 Chen Jiagu 陈家谷  – Bountiful Blessings 万福楼Chen Jiagu 陈家谷  – The In-Laws 麻婆斗妇
Ho Hock Choon 何福春  – A Song to Remember 星洲之夜
Oh Hock Leong 胡福隆  – C.L.I.F. 警徽天职
Wong Lab Seng 黄立成  – Devotion 阿娣
| valign="top" width="50%"|
 Teo Pit Hong Joyce 张必芳  – On the Fringe 边缘父子Koh Kah Yen 许家燕  – A Song to Remember 星洲之夜
Lai Chun Kwong 赖振江  – Love Thy Neighbour 四个门牌一个梦
Lee Beng Hui Steven 李明辉  – C.L.I.F. 警徽天职
Poon Yiu Tung 潘耀东  – Devotion 阿娣
|-
| colspan=2 valign="top" width="100%"|
 Evelyn Lam Li Ting 蓝丽婷  – "Nightingale Nursing Home" 照顾失当 疗养院老人受虐Ng Puay Leng 黄佩玲  – "Bird Nuisance" 扰民八哥逍遥法外 公众投诉无门
Lip Kwok Wai 聂国威  – "Legal Debt Collection Business" 经济不景 收债公司生意增多
Hu Jielan 胡洁岚  – "Oil Theft" 海上偷油 油老鼠终落网
Ng Lian Cheong 吴俍祥  – "Trapped on Bus for Two Hours" 巴士迷路 乘客受困两小时
|-
| colspan=2 valign="top" width="100%"|
 Ng Toh Heong 黄卓雄 and Chun Guek Lay 曾月丽  – Focus 焦点  – "1911 Chinese Revolution - Sun Yat Sen and Singapore" 辛亥百年-孙中山与新加坡Eugene Lim 林锦成 and Lynne Chee 徐赟羚  – Frontline 前线追踪  – "Legal Loansharks (Part 1)" 合法"大耳窿"？- 上篇 & "The Debtors' Plight" (Part 2) 欠债人的苦 - 下篇
Pang Kia Nian 冯嘉年  –  Money Week 财经追击  – Thailand Floods  – "Impact on Local Businesses" (泰国水患 影响商家)
Pang Kia Nian 冯嘉年, Eg Yik Fan 吴益帆 and Lim Nghee Huat 林义发  – Money Week 财经追击  – "Japan Quake Caused Ripples in the Singapore stock market" 日本9级大地震 震波连连 & "Japan Quake Affects Manufacturing Processes" 日本天灾 生产商遭池鱼之殃
Yap Li Ling 叶莉凌 and Sim Boon Siang 沈文祥  – Frontline 前线追踪  – "The Case of the 4 Missing Tons of Donated Goods" 捐赠品失窃
|}

 Awards eligible for voting 
Online voting for the following four awards ended on 22 April at 8.30pm, while the awards ceremony was being held.

Other awards
Rocket Award

Viewership awards
{| class="wikitable" style="text-align:center"
|-
| 
| Love Thy Neighbour  四个门牌一个梦|-
| 
| Food Source 2  食在好源头2|-
|}

 Show 2 (红星大奖2012 颁奖礼)
Main awards
{| class=wikitable
| valign="top" width="50%"|
 On The Fringe 边缘父子A Song to Remember 星洲之夜
C.L.I.F. 警徽天职
Kampong Ties 甘榜情
Secrets For Sale 拍。卖
| valign="top" width="50%"|
 Renaissance 旧欢. 心爱Food Source 2 食在好源头 2
Going Home 2 回家走走2
Mission Possible 小村大任务
Rail Thrill 铁路次文化
|-
| valign="top" width="50%"|
 Star Awards 2011 (Show 1) 银光闪耀 红星大奖2011ComChest TrueHearts 2011 公益献爱心
Lunar New Year's Eve Special 2011 金兔呈祥喜迎春
Star Awards 2011 (Show 2) 金碧辉映 红星大奖2011
The SPD Charity Show 2011 真情无障碍
| valign="top" width="50%"|
 Tuesday Report 2011: Applaud to Life 星期二特写: 谢幕人生Behind Every Job 2 美差事 苦差事 II
Culture In A Bowl 吃出一碗文化
Daddy 101 爸爸秘笈
Tuesday Report 2011: A Taste of Life 星期二特写: 人. 情. 味
|-
| valign="top" width="50%"|
 Tay Ping Hui 郑斌辉  – Bountiful Blessings 万福楼 as 谢东海 Xie DonghaiAndie Chen 陈邦鋆  – Code of Honour 正义武馆 as 欧剑锋 Ou Jianfeng
Christopher Lee 李铭顺  – The Oath 行医 as 吴国恩 Wu Guo'en
Qi Yuwu 戚玉武  –  C.L.I.F. 警徽天职 as Tang Yew Jia
Zheng Geping 郑各评  – Kampong Ties 甘榜情 as 曾友宝 Zeng You Bao
| valign="top" width="50%"|
 Joanne Peh 白薇秀  – A Tale of 2 Cities 乐在双城 as 潘乐瑶 Pan LeyaoAnn Kok 郭舒贤  – Bountiful Blessings 万福楼 as 梁品红 Liang Pinhong
Rui En 瑞恩  – A Tale of 2 Cities 乐在双城 as 章雅乐 Zhang Yale
Fann Wong 范文芳  – On the Fringe 边缘父子 as 刘佳丽 Liu Jiali
Zoe Tay 郑惠玉  – Devotion 阿娣 as 刘招娣 Liu Zhaodi
|-
| valign="top" width="50%"|
 Chen Shucheng 陈澍城  – The Oath 行医 as 吴志雄 Wu Zhi Xiong 
Chen Hanwei 陈汉玮  – A Song to Remember 星洲之夜 as 许昆 Xu Kun
Cavin Soh 苏智诚  – Love Thy Neighbour 四个门牌一个梦 as Dai Deliang
Rayson Tan 陈泰铭  – A Song to Remember 星洲之夜 as 黑蛇 Black Snake
Brandon Wong 黄炯耀  – Love Thy Neighbour 四个门牌一个梦 as 神经刀 Crazy Knife
| valign="top" width="50%"|
 Vivian Lai 赖怡伶  – Love Thy Neighbour 四个门牌一个梦 as 单珊 Shan ShanYvonne Lim 林湘萍  – The Oath 行医 as 韵文 Yuen Wen
Ng Hui 黄慧  – Kampong Ties 甘榜情 as 韩秀圆 Han Xiuyuan
Kate Pang 庞蕾馨  – On the Fringe 边缘父子 as Zhong Ling
Constance Song 宋怡霏  – On the Fringe 边缘父子 as Nancy
|-
| valign="top" width="50%"|
 Kate Pang 庞蕾馨  – A Tale of 2 Cities 乐在双城 as Lin Le 林乐'''
Adeline Lim 林赞银  – Devotion 阿娣 as Wufeng 五凤
Sora Ma 马艺瑄  – Love Thy Neighbour 四个门牌一个梦 as Dai Peijun 戴佩君  
Romeo Tan 陈罗密欧  – C.L.I.F. 警徽天职 as Koh Wen Xiong 许文雄
Jeffrey Xu 徐鸣杰  – Devotion 阿娣 as Zheng Yimin 郑逸民
| valign="top" width="50%"|
 Mark Lee 李国煌  – It's a Small World II 国记交意所 2Lee Teng 李腾  – Rail Thrill 铁路次文化
Kym Ng 鐘琴  – Chef Apprentice 名厨实习生
Pornsak  – Food Source 2 食在好源头 2 
Bryan Wong 王禄江  – Renaissance 旧欢. 心爱
|-
| valign="top" width="50%"|
 Lee Teng 李腾  – Let's Talk 2 你在囧什么?! 2Christopher Lee 李铭顺  – The Adventures of Chris 阿顺历险记
Mark Lee 李国煌  – Behind Every Job 2 美差事.苦差事2
Guo Liang 郭亮  – Legendary Cuisines II 传说中的料理 II
Bryan Wong 王禄江  – Behind Every Job 2 美差事.苦差事2
| valign="top" width="50%"|
 Tung Soo Hua 董素华Zhang Haijie 张海洁Lin Chi Yuan 林启元
Wang Zheng 王征
Zhao Wenbei 赵文蓓
|-
| valign="top" width="50%"|
 Chun Guek Lay 曾月丽  – Focus 焦点Youyi 有懿  – Good Morning Singapore! 早安您好!'''
Desmond Lim Soo Guan 林树源  – Good Morning Singapore! 早安您好!
Qi Qi 琪琪  – Good Morning Singapore! 早安您好!
Tung Soo Hua 董素华  – Money Week 财经追击
|}

All Time Favourite Artiste
This award is a special achievement award given out to a veteran artiste(s) who have achieved a maximum of 10 popularity awards over 10 years. The award will not be presented in 2013, as there are no recipients with ten Top 10 Most Popular Male or Female Artistes award wins to allow the award to be presented that year.

 Top 10 awards 
The Top 10 Most Popular Male Artists and Top 10 Most Popular Female Artists was decided by a public vote. In a first in Star Awards history, the online voting was introduced and in addition to the traditional telepoll voting, both voting methods now accounted to a 50% weightage towards the overall final result. The voting line closed on 29 April at 9pm while the Show 2 was broadcast.

 Presenters and performers 
The following individuals presented awards or performed musical numbers.

 Show 1 

 Show 2 

 Summary of nominations and awards (by programme genre) 
Most nominations
Programs that received multiple nominations are listed below, by number of nominations per work:

Most wins

 Star Awards 2012 – Blazing The Trail Star Awards 2012 - Blazing The Trail was a four 15-minute episode series premiered on 25 March 2012 from 10:30pm every Sundays. The series provided details of the award nominees of Star Awards 2012, leading up to the ceremony airing on 22 April.

 Trivia 
Consecutive nominees and awardees, firsts in Top 10
The nominees for the "Best Current Affairs Presenter" award are the same throughout three consecutive years since 2010; while the nominees for the "Best News Presenter" award are the same from last year. Each award was received by two awardees this year.
Mark Lee received the Best Variety Show Host award after not winning one in 2011.
The public voting awards for drama categories, Most Favourite Female Character and Most Favourite Male Character, were respectively won by Rui En and Elvin Ng for the second straight year.
Additionally, both aforementioned artistes went on to win the Most Favourite Onscreen Couple award.
The latter, Ng, won his second consecutive Systema Charming Smile Award.
Pierre Png, Ben Yeo, Rebecca Lim and Paige Chua won the Top 10 Most Popular Artistes award for the first time, while Quan Yi Fong not being nominated for the award for the first time.
Cynthia Koh's second Top 10 win ended a drought of not winning a Top 10, with the last win happened in 1997.

Addition and changes of awards categories
This year's Star Awards reintroduced the "Best Newcomer" award, which was last presented in 2009.
The "Most Favourite Variety Onscreen Partner" was changed to "Most Favourite Variety Show Host", which reduced the number of nominees by half, this year.

30th drama anniversary
As part of the MediaCorp Channel 8's anniversary special celebrating 30 years of Chinese language drama in Singapore, past SBC/TCS/MediaCorp stars such as Chen Xiuhuan, Yang Libing, Moses Lim, Jack Neo, Jacelyn Tay, Vincent Ng, Sharon Au and Huang Biren were invited as special guests and awards presenters.

Other trivia
Footage of Tay Ping Hui and Bryan Wong winning the Best Actor and Favourite Host respectively were seen in a skit in Star Awards 2015 Show 1.
Footage of Dennis Chew winning the Top 10 Most Popular Male Artistes was seen in a skit in Star Awards 2015 Show 1, except that he jumped for a total of four times in the footage instead of two.

Star Awards 2013 nominations
The first show of 2012 won both the Best Variety Research Writer and Best Variety Special on the following ceremony next year; for the latter it was Star Awards'' fourth win for the Best Variety Special, and the third consecutive time on doing so.

See also 
 List of programmes broadcast by Mediacorp Channel 8
 MediaCorp Channel 8
 MediaCorp Channel U
 Star Awards

References 

Star Awards